Nevada's 10th Senate district is one of 21 districts in the Nevada Senate. This seat is currently filled by Senator Fabian Doñate who was assigned after Senator Cancela's resignation on January 12, 2021 in order to join the incoming Biden/Harris Administration on January 20, 2021.

Geography
District 10 is based just to the south of Las Vegas in Clark County, covering Winchester, Paradise, and a small portion of Las Vegas proper.

The district overlaps with Nevada's 1st and 3rd congressional districts, and with the 15th and 16th districts of the Nevada Assembly.

Recent election results
Nevada Senators are elected to staggered four-year terms; since 2012 redistricting, the 10th district has held elections in midterm years.

2018

2014

Federal and statewide results in District 10

References 

10
Clark County, Nevada